St. Luke's Cathedral is the Anglican cathedral of the Diocese of Algoma. It is located in Sault Ste. Marie, Ontario, and was built in 1870.

St. Luke's was the first Anglican church built in Sault Ste. Marie. The building was consecrated on October 18, 1870.  In 1973, when the Diocese of Algoma was established, St. Luke's was designated as the Diocese's Pro-Cathedral.

References

St. Lukes's
19th-century Anglican church buildings in Canada
Buildings and structures in Sault Ste. Marie, Ontario
Anglican church buildings in Ontario
Churches completed in 1870